Only five of the seven Connecticut incumbents were re-elected.

References

See also 
 List of United States representatives from Connecticut
 United States House of Representatives elections, 1794 and 1795

1794
Connecticut
United States House of Representatives